Roman Němeček (born January 10, 1980) is a Czech professional ice hockey defenceman. He played with HC Vítkovice in the Czech Extraliga during the 2010–11 Czech Extraliga season.

References

External links

1980 births
BK Mladá Boleslav players
Czech ice hockey defencemen
EHF Passau Black Hawks players
HC Olomouc players
HC Slavia Praha players
HC Slovan Ústečtí Lvi players
HC Vítkovice players
IHC Písek players
JKH GKS Jastrzębie players
Living people
Motor České Budějovice players
Orli Znojmo players
Sportspeople from Písek
Czech expatriate ice hockey players in Germany
Czech expatriate sportspeople in Poland
Expatriate ice hockey players in Poland